In survey methodology, probability-proportional-to-size (pps) sampling is a sampling process where each element of the population (of size N) has some (independent) chance  to be selected to the sample when performing one draw. This  is proportional to some known quantity  so that .

One of the cases this occurs in, as developed by Hanson and Hurwitz in 1943, is when we have several clusters of units, each with a different (known upfront) number of units, then each cluster can be selected with a probability that is proportional to the number of units inside it. So, for example, if we have 3 clusters with 10, 20 and 30 units each, then the chance of selecting the first cluster will be 1/6, the second would be 1/3, and the third cluster will be 1/2.

The pps sampling results in a fixed sample size n (as opposed to Poisson sampling which is similar but results in a random sample size with expectancy of n). When selecting items with replacement the selection procedure is to just draw one item at a time (like getting n draws from a multinomial distribution with N elements, each with their own  selection probability). If doing a without-replacement sampling, the schema can become more complex.

See also
Bernoulli sampling
Poisson distribution
Poisson process
Sampling design

References

Sampling techniques